Events from the 1280s in the Kingdom of Scotland.

Monarchs 

 Alexander III, 1249–1286
 Margaret, Maid of Norway, 1286–1290 (heir, uncrowned)

Events 

 19 March 1286 – Alexander III dies after falling from his horse.
 November 1289 – the first Treaty of Birgham is signed by the Guardian of Scotland in Salisbury, settling competing claims to the throne and arranging for the passage of Margaret, Maid of Norway to Scotland so that she could be crowned.

Births 
Full date unknown
 c. 1280 – Edward Bruce (died 1318 in Ireland)
 c. 1283 – Edward Balliol (died 1364 in England)
 c. 1284 – Thomas de Brus (died 1307)
 c. 1285 – Alexander de Brus (died 1307)
 c. 1285 – Patrick V, Earl of March (died c. 1369)

Deaths 

 19 March 1286 – King Alexander III (born 1241)
 24 August 1289 – Patrick III, Earl of Dunbar (born c. 1213)
Full date unknown
 c. 1282 – Alexander Stewart, 4th High Steward of Scotland

See also 

 List of years in Scotland
 Timeline of Scottish history

References 

1280s